In chemistry, a chemical trap is a chemical compound that is used to detect unstable compounds. The method relies on efficiency of bimolecular reactions with reagents to produce a more easily characterize trapped product.  In some cases, the trapping agent is used in large excess.

Case studies

Cyclobutadiene
A famous example is the detection of cyclobutadiene released upon oxidation of cyclobutadieneiron tricarbonyl.  When this degradation is conducted in the presence of an alkyne, the cyclobutadiene is trapped as a bicyclohexadiene.  The requirement for this trapping experiment is that the oxidant (ceric ammonium nitrate) and the trapping agent be mutually compatible.

Diphosphorus
Diphosphorus is an old target of chemists since it is the heavy analogue of N2.  Its fleeting existence is inferred by the controlled degradation of certain niobium complexes in the presence of trapping agents.  Again, a Diels-Alder strategy is employed in the trapping:

Silylene
Another classic but elusive family of targets are silylenes, analogues of carbenes. It was proposed that  dechlorination of dimethyldichlorosilane generates dimethylsilylene: 
SiCl2(CH3)2 +  2 K →  Si(CH3)2  +  2 KCl
This inference is supported by conducting the dechlorination in the presence of trimethylsilane, the trapped product being pentamethyldisilane:
Si(CH3)2  +  HSi(CH3)3  → (CH3)2Si(H)-Si(CH3)3
Not that the trapping agent does not react with dimethyldichlorosilane or potassium metal.

Related meanings
In some cases, chemical trap is used to detect or infer a compound when present at concentrations below its detection limit or is  present in a mixture, where other components interfere with its detection.  The trapping agent, for example a dye, reacts with the chemical to be detected, giving a product that is more easily detected.

References

Analytical chemistry